Andrew Bernstein is an American philosopher.

Andrew Bernstein may also refer to:

Andrew D. Bernstein, American sports photographer
Andrew Bernstein (director), American television director